The Versatile Impressions is an album by the American soul music group the Impressions.
The album was released after the Impressions left ABC Records, and only featured one original song.

The album cover was designed so that the viewer would see a different image depending on the angle of intersection between their line of sight and the cover. Byron Goto and Henry Epstein were credited for the design of the album cover.

Track listing
 "Once in a Lifetime" (Leslie Bricusse, Anthony Newley)
 "Yesterday" (Lennon–McCartney)
 "This Is the Life" (Lee Adams, Charles Strouse)
 "Just Before Sunrise" (Mack David)
 "The Look of Love" (Burt Bacharach, Hal David)
 "Don't Cry, My Love" (Oscar Brown, Jr., Curtis Mayfield)
 "Sermonette" (Cannonball Adderley, Jon Hendricks)
 "East of Java" (Mack David)
 "Oo You're a Livin' Doll" (Johnny Pate)
 "The Fool on the Hill" (Lennon, McCartney)

Personnel
Curtis Mayfield – lead vocals, guitar
Fred Cash – backing vocals
Sam Gooden – backing vocals
The Detroit Symphony Orchestra – instrumentation
The Funk Brothers – instrumentation
Johnny Pate – producer, conductor

References

External links
 [ The Versatile Impressions] at Allmusic
 The Versatile Impressions at Warr.org

1969 albums
The Impressions albums
Albums arranged by Johnny Pate
Albums produced by Johnny Pate
ABC Records albums